Baleswari Odia (Odia: ବାଲେଶ୍ୱରୀ ଓଡ଼ିଆ), also Northern Odia or North Balasore Odia, is a dialect of Odia spoken in the northern regions of Indian state of Odisha. It is spoken in the districts of Balasore, Bhadrak, Mayurbhanj (commonly called Mayurbhanjia) and Kendujhar (commonly called Kendujharia).

It has linguistic variations to standard Odia. While the dialects spoken in these districts vary with regional influences and influences from different local community and tribal language groups, the Baleswari Odia from the northern coastal Balasore region has a distinct accent with some similarity with the nearby Medinipuri  dialect of Odia and  Bengali. The dialect in Bhadrak district have more similarity with the standard Odia.

Features 
Baleswari substitutes "କିସ" (kisa) for a frequently used word "କଣ" (kaṇa) meaning "what" and "କେନେ" (kene) for "କାହିଁକି" (kāhĩki) meaning why. Most of the syllables which are pronounced as "o" in Standard Odia are pronounced as "u" in Baleswaria such as "ଓଡ଼ିଶା" is pronounced as "ଉଡ଼ିସା" .

The following is a list of major words in Baleswari:

Grammatical differences

Vowel Harmony- o to u phoneme shift- Nouns,  this phonetic feature is also seen in Sambalpuri

Vowel Harmony- o to u phoneme shift- Verbs

Baleswari Odia words, verbs and expressions

References

Further reading 
 

Eastern Indo-Aryan languages
Languages of Odisha
Odia language